The Mandokhel is a Pashtun tribe primarily found in northern regions of the Balochistan Province and in southern Afghanistan. Most of the Mandokhails are settled in Zhob District of Balochistan Province, Pakistan; they live on both sides of the Zhob river.

Mandokhail has 4 subtribes:
(1)Mamazi, (2)Dawood, (3)Snrkhail, (4)Shaikh.
Mandokhel tribe is found on the Northern west border of Balochistan which is also known as the Durand line.

Mandokhel is one of the most literate Pashtun tribes found in Balochistan due to their low popularity. They are commonly known for their accent which they haven't changed in years. 40% of Mandokhel tribe is still found in Afghanistan.

References

 

Gharghashti Pashtun tribes
Pashto-language surnames
Pakistani names